Kensington High Street is the main shopping street in Kensington, London, England. The area is identified in the London Plan as one of 35 major centres in Greater London.

Kensington High Street is the continuation of Kensington Road and part of the A315. It starts by the entrance to Kensington Palace and runs westward through central Kensington. Near Kensington (Olympia) station, where the Royal Borough of Kensington and Chelsea ends and London Borough of Hammersmith and Fulham begins, it ends and becomes Hammersmith Road. The street is served by High Street Kensington underground station.

History 
In 1682, Francis Barry purchased land in Kensington and began to develop houses.

From the 1690s to 1893, Kensington High Street was developed around a residential terrace, with large houses occupied by a number of distinguished residents. The Terrace was located roughly between present day Wrights Lane and Adam and Eve Mews.

Residents included:
 Sir Graham Berry, Premier of Victoria, Australia
 Sir Henry Cole, museum founder
 Reverend George Davys, tutor to Queen Victoria
 Kenelm Digby, writer
 Lady Christiana Gayer, daughter of Robert Bruce, 1st Earl of Ailesbury
 John Leech, cartoonist
 Sir David Wilkie, artist.

Retail centre
Kensington High Street is one of western London's most popular shopping streets, with upmarket shops serving a wealthy area. From the late 19th century until the mid-1970s the street had three classic department stores: Barkers of Kensington, Derry & Toms and Pontings. Barkers bought Pontings in 1906 and Derry & Toms in 1920, but continued to run all three as separate entities. In a big building project which started in 1930 and was not complete until 1958 (the Second World War halted the project), the company made Derry & Toms and Barkers into Art Deco palaces. On top of Derry & Toms, Europe's largest roof garden area was created, consisting of three different gardens with 500 species of plants, fountains, a stream, duck, flamingos and a restaurant – said to serve the best high tea in Kensington.

In 1957 House of Fraser bought the Barkers Group and started to dismantle it.

Part of the Barker premises has now been taken over by American Whole Foods Market, which has opened the UK's first organic superstore there in June 2007. The rest was added to existing office space used by the headquarters of Associated Newspapers.

Kensington High Street was also the site of Biba in the 1960s and early 1970s. When Derry & Toms closed, the iconic store took the building and accentuated its Art Deco style further. But the 1970s recession, coupled with idealistic business ideas, killed Biba in 1975. The Derry & Toms roof gardens still remain, now known as the Kensington Roof Gardens which Richard Branson's Virgin occupied as a tenant from 1981 to 2018.

Kensington High Street's future as a shopping street has been threatened by the large Westfield London, which opened a short distance away in Shepherd's Bush in late 2008. However, these factors may be offset to some extent – or even outweighed – by recent changes to the road layout, intended to make the street a more pleasant place to shop. The Royal Borough of Kensington and Chelsea decided to experiment with the concept of shared space, which deputy leader Daniel Moylan had studied abroad. Railings and pedestrian crossings were removed, thereby enabling pedestrians to cross the street wherever they choose. Bicycle racks were placed on the central reservation. The effect over two years was a dramatic cut in accidents, down 44% against a London average of 17%.

Kensington High Street is also home to a large part of the British music industry, with the UK offices of major labels such as Universal Music Group, Sony Music, Warner Music Group and EMI all situated in the area.

Furthermore, the second Kahn Design boutique in London is also located on this street.

It is also the site of the former Roman Catholic Pro-Cathedral of England, Our Lady of Victories, now a parish church; Kensington Arcade; and a building housing the Consulate of Romania and the Embassy of Paraguay.

Transport links 
Kensington High Street is served by bus routes 9, 23, 27, 28, 49, 52, 70, 328, 452, C1, night routes N9, N27, N28, N31 and Greenline routes 701 and 702. It is also served by High Street Kensington Underground station, on the Circle and District lines. The circle and district line are major lines in central London, especially for the western side of central London. Living next to such an important station can help reduce time in car and bus.

References

External links 

 Kensington High Street website
 The story of John Barker & Co Ltd, Kensington, London, from Michael Moss and Alison Turton, A Legend of Retailing: House of Fraser, Weidenfeld & Nicolson, 1989.
 Remembering Barkers of Kensington 1870–2006 Images from the Barker & Co archives

Streets in the Royal Borough of Kensington and Chelsea
Shopping streets in London
Art Deco architecture in London
Major centres of London
High Street